Jesús (de) Galíndez Suárez (October 12, 1915  – disappeared March 12, 1956) was a Spanish politician, writer and Columbia University international law professor of Basque nationalist ideology who disappeared in New York City. He was allegedly kidnapped and murdered by intelligence operatives of the Servicio de Inteligencia Militar, based on a direct order from Rafael Trujillo, the caudillo of the Dominican Republic.

Early life
Galíndez was born in Madrid or Amurrio, Alava, and, as a Basque Nationalist Party member, took part on the Republican side in the Spanish Civil War. In 1939 he fled to Ciudad Trujillo, now Santo Domingo, where he lectured and represented the Basque government as a delegate. He started to investigate Trujillo and his government, encountered problems, and fled again, moving to New York City in 1946. Through the network he met with Ibero-American Poets, the Writers Guild, the International League for the Rights of Man, and the Inter-American Association for Democracy and Freedom. At Columbia University, he lectured on international law and completed his doctoral thesis about Trujillo and his rule. Galíndez allegedly became an informant for the FBI.

Disappearance
Galíndez was last seen at 10 PM on March 12, 1956, as he entered the subway station at 57th Street and 8th Ave in Manhattan. TIME magazine indicated that he disappeared near a subway station at 116th Street and Broadway.

It was well known that Galíndez feared that Dominican agents might kill him. On the night of his disappearance, two Dominican ships were in New York; one put out that night and returned after 5 hours, the other leaving later. However, investigations initially went nowhere. His body was never found, but the unraveling of the Murphy disappearance allowed further light to be shed on his case.

Murphy case
Gerald Lester Murphy was an American airline pilot for the Dominican airline, CDA. On December 4, 1956, his car was found abandoned near Ciudad Trujillo, without a trace of him.

Under pressure from relatives, their Congressional representatives, and the US State Department, the Dominican government got into the picture. It was suggested that Octavio de la Maza, also a pilot with CDA, and Murphy had a brawl, and Murphy fell from a cliff into the ocean. De la Maza was arrested and jailed, but refused to admit any involvement. On January 7, 1957, he was found hanging in his cell with a suicide note and an admission of involvement. However, circumstances of his "suicide" implied that it was staged and his note was declared a forgery by the FBI.

The trial in the US of John J. Frank in November 1956 as an unregistered agent for the Dominican government provided further insights into the Galíndez–Murphy connection. He stated that Galíndez had been under Dominican supervision for some time, and it was feared that he was writing a critical volume about Trujillo and his family. Agents offered US$25,000 to buy the manuscript, but Galíndez refused. Thus, Trujillo decided that Galíndez had to be killed.

A plan was hatched to use an American pilot, Murphy, who rented a Beech aircraft, equipped it for long-distance flight and landed on March 12 in Amityville. In the night, an ambulance arrived and a "patient" was moved on the airplane. The plane, piloted by Murphy, flew to West Palm Beach to refuel. Then, Murphy flew to the Dominican Republic with the "patient," who then disappeared. Murphy initially had plenty of money but may have talked too much and disappeared. It is alleged that Galíndez was the "patient."

Consequences
De la Maza's death created a friction between Trujillo and his son Ramfis who had been a close friend to de la Maza. In the US, Trujillo hired Sydney S. Baron and Co. to counteract the negative publicity and reactions that the case had evoked. Baron hired Morris Ernst to investigate the Galíndez disappearance. With the help of the Dominican government, they produced a report in May 1958 that whitewashed the Dominican government of any involvement. Nevertheless, Crassweller sees the Galíndez case as one factor in the deteriorating relationship between the United States and Trujillo.

The elder brother of Octavio de la Maza, Antonio de la Maza, allegedly convinced of the regime's guilt for his brother's death, became one of the assassins of Trujillo in 1961.

Literature and movies
Galíndez's book, was published in Buenos Aires and Santiago de Chile in 1956, a few months after his disappearance. Translations were later published in France and in the United States.

The Galíndez case inspired the 1961 novel Ciudad Trujillo by Andrzej Wydrzyński, a Polish novelist.

The Galíndez case also inspired the 1991 novel  by Manuel Vázquez Montalbán, which led to the 2003 movie  ("The Galíndez File") with Eduard Fernández playing his role. In 2002 Ana Diez directed the documentary Galíndez about the affair.

In his book The Feast of the Goat, Mario Vargas Llosa talks at length about Galíndez and his disappearance.

Junot Díaz briefly relates the Galíndez case in a footnote to his novel The Brief Wondrous Life of Oscar Wao.

Julia Alvarez references the disappearance of Galíndez in her novel In the Time of the Butterflies during a section from María Teresa Mirabal's perspective.

See also

List of people who disappeared

References

External links
 Jesús de Galíndez: Inside a Dictatorship (1955).Chapter in Caudillos:Dictators in Spanish America by Hugh Hamill, University of Oklahoma Press, 1992

1915 births
1956 deaths
20th century in the Dominican Republic
Assassinated dissidents
Basque Nationalist Party politicians
Basque writers
Columbia University alumni
Columbia University faculty
Executed writers
Federal Bureau of Investigation informants
Male murder victims
Missing person cases in New York City
People killed in intelligence operations
Rafael Trujillo
Spanish male writers
Spanish people murdered abroad
Spanish people of the Spanish Civil War (Republican faction)
People from Álava
People of Asturian descent
Spanish expatriates in the United States
Politicians from Madrid